Most Reverend Dr. Heinrich Mussinghoff (born 29 October 1940) was the Roman Catholic Bishop of the Aachen, Germany, from 11 February 1995 until the acceptance of his resignation on 8 December 2015.

Born in Osterwick (now Rosendahl) in northwestern Westphalia, he studied philosophy and theology in Münster and Freiburg. 1968 he was consecrated as priest in Münster by Bishop Joseph Höffner. He first worked as chaplain of Herten, then became secretary of Bishop Heinrich Tenhumberg.

In December 1994 he was appointed as bishop of Aachen, and was consecrated on 11 February 1995 by Cardinal Joachim Meisner in the Aachen Cathedral.

Coat of arms

The coat of arms of Heinrich Mussinghoff is based on the coat of arms of the diocese of Aachen, a black cross on a golden shield. The inner shield is based on the coat of arms of the diocese of Münster, a red bar on golden ground. In the upper left corner of the inner shield is an eight-cornered star, resembling the Octagon of the Aachen Cathedral as well as the eight regions of the diocese. The star symbolizes the morning star, which never sets beneath the horizon as a symbol for Jesus Christ. On the red bar are the silver Greek letters Chi and Rho as another symbol for Christ. The red rose in bottom both symbolizes the hometown Rosendahl of the bishop, but also Mary, patron saint of the cathedral, town and diocese of Aachen.

The slogan of Bishop Mussinghoff is Parate viam domini (prepare the way of the lord), taken from Isaiah (40:3).

The coat of arms was designed by Ludwig Schaffrath.

Resources
Biography at the Diocese of Aachen (German)

20th-century German Roman Catholic bishops
Roman Catholic bishops of Aachen
1940 births
Living people
Members of the Apostolic Signatura
Members of the European Academy of Sciences and Arts
21st-century German Roman Catholic bishops
20th-century German Roman Catholic priests